is a Japanese novelist.

His works are also adapted for Japanese films such as Be with You (2004), Heavenly Forest (2006), and Japanese TV series 14 Months (2003). The 2004 film Be with You became a box office hit, thrusting him into the limelight. A 2018 South Korean remake of the same film was also a box office hit in South Korea.

In 2019 Ichikawa joined the curated group of award-winning Japanese authors, Red Circle Authors.

Bibliography

Novels
 , 2002
 , 2003
 , 2003
 , 2004
 , 2004
 , 2013

Short story collections
 
 , 2007

Adaptations

Film
Be with You (2004)
Heavenly Forest (2006)
Say Hello for Me (2007)

Television
14 Months (2003)
Be with You, (2005)

References

External links
English Language Profile & Interview of Takuji Ichikawa
Takuji Ichikawa 市川拓司 at Books from Japan 
 
The Borderless Boys and Girls Club by Takuji Ichikawa

Living people
Japanese writers
1962 births